The Ulster Senior Football Championship is an inter-county and cross-border competition for Gaelic football teams in the British and Irish province of Ulster. It is organised by the Ulster Council of the Gaelic Athletic Association (GAA) and begins in early May. The final is usually played on the third Sunday in July.

All nine Ulster counties participate. It is regarded as hardest to win of the four provincial football championships. At a referee conference in January 2015, David Coldrick said about officiating in the competition: "Ulster makes or breaks you. It can be a graveyard. The games are different. There is an extra dimension and intensity, and you must be at your best. If you aren't prepared physically and mentally, the chances are you will be caught out. But when you are appointed for your first Ulster championship match, that's making progress". Derry are the current champions after beating Donegal in 2022.

The winners receive the Anglo-Celt Cup, which was presented to the Ulster Council in 1925 by John F. O'Hanlon, who was editor of The Anglo-Celt newspaper based in Cavan.

Cavan are the most successful team in Ulster Championship history, having won the competition on 40 occasions.  Cavan maintain the record for consecutive appearances in Ulster Finals. During the 1930s and 1940s, they appeared in and won seven consecutive Ulster titles. Fermanagh remain the only team not to have won an Ulster title. The Ulster Senior Football Championship celebrated its 125th year in 2013.

For many decades, winning the Ulster Senior Football Championship was considered as much as a team from Ulster could hope for, as the other provinces were usually much stronger and more competitive.

Before 1990, only Cavan in 1933, 1935, 1947, 1948 and 1952, and Down in 1960, 1961 and 1968, had won the All-Ireland Senior Football Championship title. In the 1990s however, a significant sea change took place, as the Ulster Champions won the All-Ireland in four consecutive years from 1991 to 1994. Since then Ulster has produced more All-Ireland winning teams than any other province.

Currently the Ulster Senior Football Championship is considered one of the toughest provinces to compete in. Ulster teams have gained considerable dominance on the All-Ireland scene, having won three All-Irelands from four in the early 2000s, including in 2003 when for the first time ever, the All-Ireland football final was competed for by two teams from one province.

The Ulster football final is normally played on the third Sunday in July, usually at St Tiernach's Park in Clones. From 2004 until 2006, it was staged at Croke Park in Dublin. The 2007 final—contested by Monaghan and Tyrone—marked a return to Clones, with Tyrone emerging victorious. The Athletic Grounds in Armagh hosted the 2020 final, as the fixture was played behind closed doors due to the impact of the COVID-19 pandemic on Gaelic games. The final was last played in Belfast in 1971.

In the 2000s, Armagh were a dominant force in Ulster, winning six titles in eight years between 1999 and 2006. Donegal won consecutive Ulster titles from the preliminary round in 2011 and 2012 (a feat achieved by no other county) and added the All-Ireland Senior Football Championship in 2012.

The 2019 final had the highest score for the winning team in the final (Donegal that year) since 1933 when Cavan won, and the second highest score ever. It also had the highest Ulster final score for the losing team ever (Cavan on this occasion).

Current team details

The Ulster championship is contested by the nine traditional counties in the Irish province of Ulster. The province comprises the six counties of Northern Ireland plus the counties of Cavan, Donegal and Monaghan in the Republic of Ireland.  It is the only provincial championship which is mostly composed of UK teams.

Format
The Ulster Senior Football Championship is a straight knock-out competition. Seven of the nine teams are drawn in the quarter-finals, while the other two teams contest a preliminary match to determine the final quarter-final place. The winners of the championship enter the All-Ireland Senior Football Championship at the quarter-final group stage, while the other eight teams compete in the All-Ireland qualifiers.

Before the introduction of the qualifiers in 2001, the winners of the Ulster Championship went straight to the semi-final stage of the All-Ireland Championship, along with the winners of the Leinster, Munster and Connacht Championships.

List of winners by county
A golden background denotes years in which the Ulster champions also won the All-Ireland Championship.

List of finals by year

Notes
 2020 No crowd attendance due to the impact of the COVID-19 pandemic on Gaelic games
 1939 Game abandoned – replay ordered
 1907 No official final result in records
 1901-1902 championship was played over two seasons and only counts as one Ulster Title
 1900 Antrim were to have represented Ulster but gave walkover to Galway.
 1892–1900 No championship. Cavan played in Leinster Senior Football Championship in 1895.
 1891 Cavan Slashers, (Cavan) v Armagh Harps, (Armagh) game Abandoned Smithboro Co Monaghan game replayed Cavan 1-11 Armagh 0-00
 1890 Armagh Harps, (Armagh) v Owen Roe O'Neill's (Tyrone) 
 1889 No Ulster championship
 1888 Ulster Senior Football Championship Inniskeen Grattans of (Monaghan) v Maghera MacFinns of (Cavan) game went to a Replay
 1887 No Ulster championship

Managers

Managers in the Ulster Championship are involved in the day-to-day running of the team, including the training, team selection, and sourcing of players from the club championships. Their influence varies from county-to-county and is related to the individual county boards. From 2018, all inter-county head coaches must be Award 2 qualified. The manager is assisted by a team of two or three selectors and an extensive backroom team consisting of various coaches. Prior to the development of the concept of a manager in the 1970s, teams were usually managed by a team of selectors with one member acting as chairman.

Scoring records
On 9 July 2006, Oisín McConville became the record point scorer in the history of the Ulster Senior Football Championship in that year's final at Croke Park.

All-time top Ulster scorers
As of 3 June 2008 according to the BBC. Updated list (2012)

Notes:
Includes Ulster Championship, All-Ireland Championship and Qualifiers.

All-time top Ulster goalscorers
As of 15 June 2008, according to the Sunday Tribune.

Notes:
Includes Ulster Championship, All-Ireland Championship and Qualifiers.
Since the records have been done Brendan Coulter has become the top goal scorer with 18.
Paddy Bradley scored 4 more goals and finished on 17.

Ulster top scorers by year
 2022 Shane McGuigan (Derry) 1-17
 2021 Darren McCurry (Tyrone) 0-22
 2020 Gearóid McKiernan (Cavan) 0-11 & Rian O'Neill (Armagh) 0-11 & Donal O'Hare (Down) 1-8
 2019 Rian O'Neill (Armagh) 0-18
 2018 Paddy McBrearty (Donegal) 0-19
 2017 Conor McManus (Monaghan) 2-13
 2016 Conor McManus (Monaghan) 1-20
 2015 Conor McManus (Monaghan) 1-19
 2014 Conor McManus (Monaghan) 1-14
 2013 Colm McFadden (Donegal) 2-12
 2012 Colm McFadden (Donegal) 2-15
 2011 Martin Clarke (Down) & Seán Cavanagh (Tyrone) 2-16
 2010 Martin Clarke (Down) 1-30
 2009 Paddy Bradley (Derry) 3–12
 2008 Steven McDonnell (Armagh) 1-17
 2007 Tommy Freeman (Monaghan) 1-15
 2006 Oisín McConville (Armagh) 3–25
 2005 Stephen O'Neill (Tyrone) 1–26
 2004 Colm McFadden (Donegal) & Oisín McConville (Armagh) 1–13
 2003 Peter Canavan (Tyrone) 1–38
 2002 Rory Gallagher (Fermanagh) 4–12
 2001 Rory Gallagher (Fermanagh) 0–16
 2000 Rory Gallagher (Fermanagh) 1–19
 1999 Oisín McConville (Armagh) 3–18
 1998 Joe Brolly (Derry) & Tony Boyle (Donegal) 0–13
 1997 Joe Brolly (Derry) 3–15
 1996 Peter Canavan (Tyrone) 3–13
 1995 Peter Canavan (Tyrone) 0–20
 1994 Peter Canavan (Tyrone) 1–17
 1993 John Toner (Armagh) 0–23
 1992 Enda Gormley (Derry) 0–25
 1991 Ross Carr (Down) 0–21
 1990 Manus Boyle (Donegal) 1–16
 1989 Martin McHugh (Donegal) 2–16
 1988 Stephen Conway (Tyrone) 0–17
 1987 Enda Gormley (Derry) 0–20
1986 Brendan Mason (Down) 3–17
1985 Eamonn McEneaney (Monaghan) 3–16
1984 Frank McGuigan (Tyrone) 0–19
1983 Derek McDonnell (Cavan) 4–11
1982 John Corvan (Armagh) & Peter McGinnity (Fermanagh) 1–9
1981 Eamonn McEneaney (Monaghan) & Brendan McGovern (Down) 1–17
1980 Patsy Hetherington (Tyrone) & Patsy Kerlin (Tyrone) 4–3
1979 Kieran Finlay (Monaghan) 1–18
1978 Donal Donohoe (Cavan) 0–12
1977 Brendan Kelly (Derry) 2–10
1976 Steve Duggan (Cavan) 1–22
1975 Willie Walsh (Down) 3–8
1974 Seamus Bonner (Donegal) 6–4
1973 Patsy Hetherington (Tyrone) 0–17
1972 Joe Winston (Donegal) 0–26
1971 Sean O'Connell (Derry) 1–18
1970 Andy McCallin (Antrim) 3–15
1969 Sean Woods (Monaghan) & Gene Cusack (Cavan) 3–7
1968 Paddy Doherty (Down) 1–17
1967 Charlie Gallagher (Cavan) 0-*19
1966 PT Treacy (Fermanagh) 4–13
1965 Charlie Gallagher (Cavan) 2–29
1964 Charlie Gallagher (Cavan) 0-*19
1963 Harry Laverty (Donegal) 2–10
1962 Seamus McMahon (Cavan) & Frankie Donnelly (Tyrone) 0–11
1961 Paddy Doherty (Down) 1–16
1960 Con Smith (Cavan) 1–17
1959 Paddy Doherty (Down) 1–17
1958 Paddy Doherty (Down) 3–14
1957 Frankie Donnelly (Tyrone) 1–14
1956 Frankie Donnelly (Tyrone) & Victor Sherlock (Cavan) 2–7
1955 Peter Donohoe (Cavan) 0–14
1954 Brian Gallagher (Cavan) 0–14
1953 Art O'Hagan (Armagh) 3-04
1952 John Joe Cassidy (Cavan) 1-07
1951 Joe McCallin (Antrim) 3–14
1950 Peter Donohoe (Cavan) 3–18
1949 Peter Donohoe (Cavan) 4–10
1948 Peter Donohoe (Cavan) 3–12

* Scores only include Ulster Championship. All-Ireland Championship and Qualifiers are not included.

Gallery

Broadcasters
In the late 1990s, matches were broadcast in Northern Ireland by UTV before moving to BBC Northern Ireland.

Team progress since 2001
Below is a record of each county's performance since the introduction of the qualifier system to the All-Ireland series in 2001. Qualifiers did not occur from 2020-2021 due to the impact of the COVID-19 pandemic on Gaelic games.

Key

By Semi-Final Appearances (Since 2020) 
Bold indicates years reached to final.

See also
 All-Ireland Senior Football Championship
 Leinster Senior Football Championship
 Munster Senior Football Championship
 Connacht Senior Football Championship

Notes

References

External links

 "Anglo Celt Cup winners". BBC. 2009.
 Do you remember the last Ulster SFC final before the back door arrived?

 
1888 establishments in Ireland
Recurring sporting events established in 1888
3
1